Hans Christian may refer to:

People 
 Hans Christian (musician) (born 1960), German-born musician and producer
 Hans Christian Andersen (1805–1875), Danish author and poet
 Hans Christian Gram (1853–1938), Danish bacteriologist
 Hans Christian Ørsted (1777–1851), Danish physicist and chemist
 Hans Christian Hansen (1906-1960), Danish Prime Minister
 Hans-Christian Ströbele (born 1939), German politician and lawyer
 Hans Christian Blech (1915–1993), German film, stage and television character actor
 Hans Christian Doseth (1958–1984), Norwegian climber
  (born 1952), Danish politician
  (1794–1880), Norwegian military officer
  (1933–2008), Danish actor
  (born 1940), German theologian
  (1925–1992), German botanist 
  (born 1958), German theologian

Other uses
 Hans Christian

See also 
 Hans Christian Andersen (disambiguation)